Government First Grade College, Sirwar is a government first grade college in raichur district in Karnataka state, India.

Description
Government First Grade College, Sirwar is a general degree college located at Sirwar, Raichur, Karnataka. It was established in 2014. The college is affiliated with Gulbarga University. Affiliated College of Gulbarga University, this college offers different courses in arts, science and commerce.

References

External links
https://gfgc.kar.nic.in/sriwar/About-Us
 

Educational institutions established in 2014
2014 establishments in Karnataka
Universities and colleges in Raichur district
 Colleges affiliated to Raichur University
Sirwar
 Education in Raichur district